Karl, Truchsess von Waldburg (7 August 1548 –  18 June 1593), Baron and Steward of Waldburg in Trauchburg (1580), Imperial minister. Karl was born in the Fürstenburg fortress of Heiligenberg, the third son of William, known as the Younger, (6 March 1518 – 17 January 1566), Baron and Seneschal of Waldburg and an Imperial Councilor, and his wife, Johanna v. Fürstenberg (1529–1589). His family was an old Swabian house and he was descended from the Jacobin line of the House.

After 1580, he also bore the title Truchseß von Waldburg in Trauchburg (1580) and president of the Imperial Judicial Chambers.  He served his brother, Gebhard Truchsess von Waldburg, as steward and stadtholder of Bonn after 1582, and as his brother's general in the Cologne War (1582–1589). He migrated with his brother to Strasbourg at the conclusion of the war in 1589, and died there in 1593. He is buried in the Strasbourg Minister.

On 6 May 1572, he married Countess Leonore of Hohenzollern (15 February 1551 – after 2 April 1605), daughter of Charles I, Count of Hohenzollern and Margravine Anna of Baden-Durlach.

Family tree

Notes and references
  Michaela Waldburger, Waldburg und Waldburger - Ein Geschlecht steigt auf in den Hochadel des Alten Reiches 2009, Accessed 15 October 2009

References and notes

Bibliography

Waldburg, Michaela, Waldburg und Waldburger – Ein Geschlecht steigt auf in den Hochadel des Alten Reiches, 2009, Accessed 15 October 2009
Vochezer, Joseph, Geschichte des fürstlichen hauses Waldburg in Schwaben, v. 3 (1907), Kempten, Kösel, 1888–1907.

House of Waldburg
1548 births
1593 deaths